FCK won the Danish Superliga trophy in the season 2005-06. The championship was secured on May 7 after a 0–1 defeat at Fionia Park against Odense BK, but with simultaneously, AC Horsens winning 4–1 over Brøndby IF.

They won on April 6 the Royal League again, after an exciting final against Lillestrøm S.K., where Razak Pimpong scored the decisive goal in the final seconds.

FCK were knocked out of the UEFA Cup by Hamburger SV on September 29 after a very controversial refereeing performance by British Matthew Messias, giving eight yellow cards, two of those leading to a sending off, and a third direct red card, all in the last ten minutes, and giving HSV a 92nd-minute penalty kick.

Competitions
This season F.C. Copenhagen played in the Danish Superliga, Danish Cup, UEFA Cup and Royal League.

Danish Superliga

In the Superliga they were at the winter break placed first, with only one defeat and four draws after 20 matches. Their biggest win was a 5–1 win against Esbjerg fB at Parken on September 25, where Elrio van Heerden and Marcus Allbäck scored both twice, while the fifth goal was scored by Peter Møller.

At October 26 FCK visited Haderslev Fodboldstadion, where SønderjyskE was the home team. After SønderjyskE opened the match with a Henrik Hansen-goal, Álvaro Santos made it 1–1 with a beautiful scissors kick, which later was awarded as goal of the year. Elrio van Heerden scored to 2–1, Peter Møller to 3–1 and Álvaro made his second goal in the extra time.

The only autumn defeat was against Esbjerg fB on November 5, 2005, where they lost 3–1 at Esbjerg Idrætspark.

On March 12, 2006 they got their second defeat. This time was it the arch rivals Brøndby IF who beat FCK. That match ended 3-0 at Brøndby Stadium.

The championship was secured on May 7 after a 0–1 defeat at Fionia Park against Odense BK, but with simultaneously, AC Horsens winning 4–1 over Brøndby IF.

In the last match on May 14, FCK lost again, this time to Silkeborg IF home at Parken, 2–3 in a very even match. Michael Silberbauer and Brede Hangeland were the goalscorers for F.C. Copenhagen.

Danish Cup

In the Cup, FCK started in 5th round, where they met the 2nd Division East team Slagelse BI. After 2–2 at full-time and extra time, the match was decided on penalties. Here, FCK won 4–3, and went through to the quarter finals.

In the quarter finals, the opponents were the arch rivals Brøndby IF at Brøndby Stadium, where Brøndby won 1-0 after extra time and two red cards to FCK in the second half.

UEFA Cup

In the UEFA Cup they started in the 2nd Qualifying Round where they beat Carmarthen Town from Wales with 4–0 agg.

In the 1st round they played against German Hamburger SV. The first leg was played in the AOL Arena in Hamburg and ended 1–1. Hamburger SV won the second leg in Parken 1–0 to eliminate F.C. Copenhagen and got through to the group stage.

Royal League

In the group stage F.C. Copenhagen were in group 2 with the archrivals Brøndby IF, Swedish Kalmar FF and Norwegian Lillestrøm S.K. in the group 2. FCK won only one match, but with four draws, FCK qualified for the quarter finals, where they met Hammarby IF.

The game would be special for FCK captain Tobias Linderoth, as Hammarby's coach, Anders Linderoth, is his father. In the same matches, both teams were playing in Kappa shirts, and for the draw, the two captains, Tobias Linderoth (Swede, FCK) and Mikkel Jensen (Dane, Hammarby), were dressed in almost identical cardigans. The only difference was the team names.

After a 2–0 victory home at Parken, FCK could spot the semi finals in the horizont, but with two Hammarby goals in the last 5 minutes. Then a penalty shootout should decide their Royal League future, but with 3 FCK goals, and 3 Jesper Christiansen saves, they won the shootout 3–0.

In the semi finals, FCK drew the other remaining Danish team, FC Midtjylland. Home FCK won 3-1 and away, at SAS Arena, they beat FCM 4–0.

F.C. Copenhagen won in the 2005-06 Royal League season, after an exciting final against Lillestrøm S.K., played at Parken. FCK won 1–0 after an 89th minute Razak Pimpong-goal. Pimpong had substituted Ijeh in the 69th minute, and he got his second yellow card in his enthusiasm after the goal, where he took off his shirt.

Squads
The following squads, are lists with all the players, who have played in F.C. Copenhagen in the 2005–06 season.

First team squad

Second team squad

Transfers

Players In

Players out

Competition statistics

Danish Superliga

Classification

Results summary

Results

Results for F.C. Copenhagen for season 2005-2006.

NOTE: scores are written FCK first

Key:
DSL = Danish Superliga
DC = Danish Cup
UCQ = UEFA Cup Qualifier
UC1 = UEFA Cup Round 1
RLB = Royal League Group B
RL4 = Royal League Quarter-finals
RLS = Royal League Semi-finals
RLF = Royal League Final
VCD = Viasat Cup Group D
VC4 = Viasat Cup Quarter-finals
LMC = La Manga Cup
F = Friendly match

Report explanation
FCK in Danish
UEFA in English
Royal League in:
Lillestrøm 0-0 FCK: Norwegian
FCK 1-1 Brøndby: Danish
Kalmar 1-0 FCK: Swedish
Brøndby 1-2 FCK: Danish
FCK 1-1 Lillestrøm: Danish
FCK 1-1 Kalmar: Danish
FCK 2-0 Hammarby: Danish
Hammarby 2-3 FCK: Swedish
FCK 3-1 Midtjylland: Danish
Midtjylland 0-4 FCK: Danish
FCK 1-0 Lillestrøm: Danish

Season statistics

Top goalscorers

Attendances
Spectators on home ground 2005-06
366,369 spectators in 17 Superliga matches
Average: 21,551

Best visited FCK home match 2005-06
41,201 spectators against Brøndby IF on 30 April 2006

Worst visited FCK home match 2005-06
15,025 spectators against AC Horsens on 22 November 2005

Honours
The Autumn Profile (2005): Michael Gravgaard
Profile of the year in the Superliga (2005): Michael Gravgaard
Goal of the year (2005): Álvaro Santos (against SønderjyskE on 2005-10-26)
The Golden Goalie (2005): Jesper Christiansen
The Spring Profile (2006): Tobias Linderoth
The Spring Manager (2006): Ståle Solbakken
Player of the Spring (2006): Marcus Allbäck
Team of the Year (2005): Jesper Christiansen, Lars Jacobsen and Michael Gravgaard

See also
2005–06 Danish Superliga
2005–06 UEFA Cup
2005–06 Royal League
Viasat Cup

References

F.C. Copenhagen seasons
Copenhagen